Boisfeuillet Jones (January 22, 1913 in Macon, Georgia – July 18, 2001 in Atlanta, Georgia) was an American educator and president of several philanthropic organizations in Atlanta, Georgia, USA.

Emory
Jones earned a J.D. degree from Emory University. He then worked at Emory from 1946 to 1960, first as an assistant professor of political science, and later dean of administration and a vice president.

Philanthropy
Jones served as president of numerous philanthropic organizations in Atlanta. These included the Emily and Ernest Woodruff Foundation and the Robert W. Woodruff Foundation (from 1964 to 1988), and the Joseph B. Whitehead, Lettie Pate Whitehead and Lettie Pate Evans foundations (from 1972 to 1988).

Legacy
The Boisfeuillet Jones Atlanta Civic Center, and the Boisfeuillet Jones Center (which houses some of Emory's administrative offices, including the Office of Financial Aid and the Career Center), are both named in honor of Jones.

Family
Jones was the son of Frederick R. Jones (1874-1941) and Clare T. Boisfeuillet (1885-1981). He married Anne Baynon Register and had two children. His daughter is Laura Jones Hardman. His son, Boisfeuillet Jones Jr., is former Vice Chairman of The Washington Post Company.

References

External links 

 Stuart A. Rose Manuscript, Archives, and Rare Book Library, Emory University: Boisfeuillet Jones papers, 1913-2005

1913 births
2001 deaths
Emory University School of Law alumni
Emory University faculty
Philanthropists from Georgia (U.S. state)
20th-century American philanthropists